Steven "Steve" Moore (born 1965) is an American cartoonist, screenwriter, producer and feature film director. He is the creator and director of the syndicated sports cartoon In the Bleachers  and the animated movies Open Season (Sony Pictures Animation), and the Alpha and Omega franchise (alongside Ben Gluck).

Moore contributed a unique one page story to the Tarzan and the Comics of Idaho #1 anthology published by Idaho Comics Group in August 2014.

Filmography

References

External links
 

1965 births
American cartoonists
American comics artists
American male screenwriters
American film directors
American film producers
American animated film directors
American animated film producers
American animators
Living people